Bedner is a surname. Notable people with the surname include:

 Al Bedner (1898–1988), American football player
 Andrew Bedner (born 1981), American man

See also
 Bender (surname)
 Benner (surname)
 Berner